Ferruccio Mataresi (1928-2009) was born in Livorno and began his artistic career in 1940 with the teaching of the painter Eugenio Carraresi it continues the study in the Accademia delle Belle Arti of Florence and it frequents the study of Pietro Annigoni.

To Livorno he is the only painter to follow the teachings and the Neoclassic pictorial tide of Pietro Annigoni that it transfers readapting in the century XIX the painting proper of the Renaissance period.

Numerous the portraits by Mataresi by the known of the city of Livorno to the famous historical characters what: Carlo Azeglio Ciampi, Giovanni Paolo II, Padre Lanfranco Serrini and the baritone Danilo Checchi. 
Of particular aesthetic value and beautiful examples of this artist's pictorial style, are the portrait of the writer and painter Riccardo Rossi Menicagli from 1984 and his sister Isabella Rossi (nephews of the painter Voltolino Fontani and friends of Mataresi).

Some works are located in public collections and deprived by to quote the positions at the Building of the Quirinale, to the center Rai, and to the Domus Pacis, to the Franciscan Museum modern art to Assisi and to the Museum Civic Giovanni Fattori of Livorno.
Bashful artist to lived a solitary life among his few students, to remember the painter Nicola Giusfredi, spending his years in the study of art Scali d'Azeglio to take care of his painting and his pet.

Prizes and Public Works
 2007, international prize di arte “Le muse” nella 42º edizione, Livorno.
 1993, portrait di Giovanni Paolo II, esposto nel refettorio della Basilica di S. Francesco ad Assisi.
 2005 solo exhibition dal titolo “Arte Sacra e Ritratti”, presso l' Abbazia di San Zeno.

References

External links 
 
 
 
 
 

Italian artists
People from Livorno
1928 births
2009 deaths